Noise Factory were an English breakbeat hardcore and jungle group active in the early 1990s. The group is credited as being pivotal in the transition between hardcore and jungle music.

History
DJ James Stephens went to Paul Ibiza of Ibiza Records' house to set up a newly acquired Akai 950 sampler. After a session of creating beats, Stephens decided to call himself 'Noise Factory', later bringing Terry Turner into the group. Ibiza invited Stephens to use the Ibiza Records label, as it was an established name at the time. Noise Factory released its first track, "Box Bass" in 1991. The track featured a reggae sub-bass, which was almost unheard of at the time.

After working for the Ibiza label, Stephens helped to set up his own labels Kemet Records and 3rd Party Records in 1992 with old friend Mark Rangers, known as "Mark X". Noise Factory opened the 3rd Party label with the EP "My Mind" featuring its title track, “Be Free", and "Breakage #1" which would be pivotal in the early development of jungle and would be later remixed by the group several times. The group would continue to release singles such as "Set Me Free", which sampled Fleetwood Mac's "Sara".

In 1993, "The Capsule" EP was released. The track "Breakage #4" became a huge hit with DJ's, who according to Vice "played it to death". The track was up to 20 BPM faster than other tracks at the time, and would prove to be an important record in the transition from hardcore to jungle. Noise Factory proceeded to release several 12" singles that would set a blueprint for the emerging scene. Additionally, a side project known as Straight from the Bedroom was launched, releasing records from not only themselves, but also other up-and-coming jungle producers.

The final collaboration between Stephens and Turner would be on "Dreams", released on Kemet Records' "Revelation Part 2" EP. Stephens would maintain a solo career under the name Family of Intelligence.

Noise Factory was briefly revived in 2002, releasing two singles for Three Lions Recordings. Additionally, Terry Tee had resurrected the Straight From the Bedroom side-project in the 2000s to carry nu skool jungle bootlegs.

Members
James Stephens 
Terry Tee (Turner)
Kevin Mulqueen

Selected discography

"Box Bass / Recession Time" (1991)
"Who Are You / The Dungeon" (1991)
"Noise Factory / Warehouse Music" (1991)
"The Buzz / Imperative" (1991)
"Loving You / Jungle Techno" (1991)
"Feel The Music / To The Top" (1991)
"Set Me Free / Bring Forward The Noise" (1992)
"We Have It / Warning" (1992)
"Urban Music" (1992)
"Behold The Jungle / We Can" (1992)
"My Mind / Be Free" (1992)
"The Fire / Skin Teeth" (1992)
"Alienation EP" (1992)
"The Capsule EP (Breakage#4 / Futuroid / Survival)" (1992)
"Year of the Ladies EP" (1993)
"A New Something EP" (1993)
"Generation X" (1993)
"Can You Feel The Rush / Run Come Follow Me" (1993)
"The Future" (1994)

References

Further reading

External links
James Stephens on Discogs
Noise Factory discography at Discogs
Terry Turner on Discogs

English dance music groups
Breakbeat hardcore music groups
English electronic music groups
Remixers